Yonkers Water Works is a historic public water works located at Yonkers, Westchester County, New York. Three buildings remain extant; two were built in 1876 and one in 1898.  They are reflective of the High Victorian style.  The Tuckahoe Road Pumping Station was built in 1876 and expanded before 1900.  The original section is three bays wide and three bays deep with a central projecting pavilion and pedimented gable roof.  The gatehouse at Grassy Sprain Reservoir was also constructed in 1876.  It is a small, one story masonry building on a high granite foundation.  The Tubewell Station was built in 1898 and expanded in 1922.  It is a red brick building, one and one half stories high and five bays wide and 13 bays deep.

It was added to the National Register of Historic Places in 1982.

See also

References

Buildings and structures in Yonkers, New York
Water supply infrastructure on the National Register of Historic Places
Government buildings on the National Register of Historic Places in New York (state)
Infrastructure completed in 1876
Infrastructure completed in 1898
Victorian architecture in New York (state)
Former pumping stations
National Register of Historic Places in Yonkers, New York